The Supreme Court of the State of New York, Appellate Division, Second Judicial Department, or simply the Second Department, is one of the four geographical components of the Supreme Court, Appellate Division, the intermediate appellate court of the State of New York. Its courthouse is located in Brooklyn, New York City.

The court has jurisdiction to hear civil and criminal appeals from the trial courts located in 10 counties: Dutchess, Orange, Putnam, Rockland, and Westchester in the Hudson Valley, Nassau and Suffolk on Long Island, and Kings (Brooklyn), Queens, and Richmond (Staten Island) in New York City. These counties comprise 8% of New York State's land area, yet account for more than 50% of its population.

As with all four departments of the Appellate Division, the Second Department was created in its current form by the Constitution of the State of New York, adopted at the 1894 constitutional convention. The constitution fixes the number of justices at seven, but the governor may designate additional justices if there is a need. The court currently has 22 judicial seats.

, the Second Department is the busiest appellate court in the United States and decides 65% of all cases in the Appellate Division. The court issued more than 3,500 rulings in 2017. Its caseload surpassed that of the First Department, based in Manhattan, for the first time in 1966.

The Second Department courthouse was designed by Slee & Bryson in the neoclassical style. Construction began on March 1, 1937, and the courthouse opened on September 28, 1938.

List of presiding justices 

 Harry E. Lewis (1946–1948)
 A. Gail Prudenti (2002–2011)
 William F. Mastro, acting (2011–2021)
 Hector LaSalle (2021–present)

See also 

 New York State Supreme Court, Appellate Division, First Department

References

External links 

New York Supreme Court, Appellate Division
Organizations based in Brooklyn
Politics of Brooklyn
Brooklyn Heights